Sanchana Natarajan is an Indian model and actress who has appeared in Tamil and Telugu films. Having appeared in small roles in films including Irudhi Suttru (2016) and 2.0 (2018), Sanchana rose to fame with her role in Balaji Mohan's web series As I'm Suffering From Kadhal (2017).

Career
Sanchana completed her education at CSI Jessie Moses School in Anna Nagar, Chennai before going on to pursue a degree in Visual Communication from MOP Vaishnav College for Women. During her time at college, she became interested in the fashion industry and gained a working knowledge after interacting with models and designers from the fraternity, which led her to develop an affinity for modelling and acting. She walked the ramp for Chennai-based choreographers and designers including Sunil Menon, Srini Subramanian and Dalu; and went on to participate in the Miss South India pageant during 2012. In 2013, she partook in Raj TV's reality television show Tamil Pesum Kadhanayagi, which aimed to find the next best Tamil-speaking lead actress, and won first prize. As a result, Sanchana was offered the chance to make her acting debut through a pivotal role in Balaji Sakthivel's Ra Ra Rajasekhar. Despite beginning shoot in 2014, the film remains unreleased as a result of financial problems faced by the producers, Thirrupathi Brothers. Sanchana then appeared in a small role in Lakshmy Ramakrishnan's Nerungi Vaa Muthamidathe (2014) before working as an actress in YouTube videos and collaborated with Chennai-based entertainment channels, gaining attention for the "Dappangkuthu" video with Put Chutney. She later got introduced to director Balaji Mohan and worked with him on the short film, Jeeboomba. During the period, she also portrayed a small role of a boxing student in Sudha Kongara's bilingual Irudhi Suttru (2016) starring Madhavan and Ritika Singh. The success of the film prompted Sudha to cast her in the same role in the Telugu version, Guru (2017) starring Venkatesh, the following year.

In early 2017, Sanchana competed for the Femina Miss India 2017 title and finished in the top three finalists of the Tamil Nadu quotient. Sanchana made a breakthrough in her acting career after being cast in Balaji Mohan's web series As I'm Suffering From Kadhal (2017), which won positive reviews upon release. Portraying the role of Divya, who is in a live-in relationship with the character of Badri portrayed by Sananth, Sanchana garnered popularity through her performance and later described that she related to "90% of Divya's character". She has also shot for a small role in Shankar's science fiction film 2.0 (2018), where she filmed for scenes alongside Rajinikanth. She played a supporting role in Jagame Thanthiram.

Filmography

Films

Television

Web series

Short films

Awards and nominations

References

Living people
Indian film actresses
Actresses in Telugu cinema
Actresses in Tamil cinema
Actresses in Malayalam cinema
Actresses from Chennai
21st-century Indian actresses
1995 births